The Tuskys Wareng Cross Country is an annual cross country running competition that takes place in November near Eldoret in Kenya. The name is derived from the sponsor, Tuskys Supermarket, which is based in Wareng County.

The event was inaugurated in December 2006 with its soft grassy course located in the Huruma area four kilometres west of the centre of Eldoret (a town renowned for long-distance running). The first edition was known as the Tuskermatt Cross Country, but this changed to its current title the year after. The competition's programme of events comprised two senior races (men's 12 km and women's 8 km) and two junior races (boy's 8 km and girl's 6 km). The competition quickly attracted a high number of top level runners in the region and by 2008 the senior men's race alone garnered some 250 entries. It developed into one of the major Kenyan annual races and Kipchoge Keino, head of Kenyan Olympic Committee, was present that year.

Although the event attracts almost exclusively Kenyan runners, the calibre of the competitors is very high, such is the country's  strength internationally. World Cross Country champions Emily Chebet and Vivian Cheruiyot have both won the competition, while the men's side has been won by world half marathon champion Wilson Kiprop, World Cross runner-up Moses Mosop, and World Cross team medallist Hosea Macharinyang. Among those to have won the junior races, Leonard Komon, Mercy Cherono, Daniel Salel and Purity Cherotich Rionoripo have gone on to win World Junior Cross Country medals.

Past race winners

References

Cross country running competitions
Athletics competitions in Kenya
Sport in Rift Valley Province
Eldoret
Recurring sporting events established in 2006
Cross country running in Kenya
Annual sporting events in Kenya
2006 establishments in Kenya